Mid-Annandale Football Club, nicknamed Mids, are a football club from the town of Lockerbie in the Dumfries and Galloway area of Scotland. They play in the South of Scotland Football League.

History
The history of organised football in Lockerbie goes back to 1877, with the formation of the original Mid-Annandale F.C. This club folded in 1894. Over the next few years a number of unsuccessful attempts were made to establish a side in Lockerbie, but it was not until after the end of the First World War that a new Mid-Annandale team filled that void.

In 1921, the Mids joined the Southern Counties Football League and enjoyed rapid success. They won the title that season, and retained the trophy the following season. An invitation to join the new Third Division of the Scottish Football League was accepted in 1923, but this ill-fated expansion folded in 1926, leaving the Mids without a league home. Although they were eventually accepted into the Scottish Alliance League, the glory days were long gone. The club eventually quit their Kintail Park ground and used various school playing fields for the rest of their career. Despite a run of success in the Charity Cup during the early-30s, the club folded in 1936.

Modern club 
The current club were formed in 1959 as Lockerbie Boys Club FC, and played in the Dumfries Amateur Football League until 2003, winning the title on one occasion in 1978 before joining the South of Scotland Football League. Their best finish in the league is runners-up in the 2017–18 season.

In July 2018, they appointed James Nichols as Manager. Nichols had been working in the Northern English league structure for Kendal Town but had caught Mid-Annandale's attention after he was appointed the first ever Manager of the Cascadian Football team.

Ground and colours
Mid-Annandale play their fixtures at New King Edward Park, which re-opened mid-way through the 2014–15 season.  Prior to this, the club were sharing with Annan Athletic at their Galabank ground. During their time in the Scottish Football League they played at Kintail Park.

The team's strip colours are yellow and black.

Honours

Original club 
Scottish Qualifying Cup
Winners: 1926–27
Runners-up: 1922–23
Southern Counties Football League
Champions 1921–22, 1922–23
Southern Counties Cup
Winners 1928–29
Southern Counties Charity Cup
Winners 1926–27, 1932–33, 1934–35, 1935–36

Modern club 
South of Scotland Football League
 Runners-up: 2017–18
Southern Counties FA Alba Cup
Winners: 2017–18, 2019–20
Wigtownshire & District FA Cree Lodge Cup
Winners:  2018–19
Dumfries & District Amateur Football League
Champions: 1977–78

References

 
Football clubs in Scotland
Football clubs in Dumfries and Galloway
Association football clubs established in 1959
1959 establishments in Scotland
Scottish Football League teams
South of Scotland Football League teams
Lockerbie